is a Japanese manga artist of Neon Genesis Evangelion: Angelic Days, a manga based on the anime Neon Genesis Evangelion by Gainax). This was the first project Hayashi had worked on for Kadokawa Shoten.

External links 
  
 

Living people
Manga artists from Fukui Prefecture
Year of birth missing (living people)